Liu Jiawei (born 28 April 1993) is a Chinese footballer who plays as midfielder for Chinese club a Wuhan Jiangcheng.

Club career
In 2011, Liu Jiawei started his professional footballer career with Hubei Youth in the China League Two. He transferred to Chinese Super League club Shanghai Greenland in 2014 after a short spell with Guangzhou R&F. On 27 September 2014, Li made his debut for Shanghai Shenhua in the 2014 Chinese Super League against Shandong Luneng Taishan. He was loaned to Shanghai Shenhua's satellite team Atlético Museros in the Regional Preferente de la Comunidad Valenciana for the 2015–16 season. In July 2016, Liu was loaned to Segunda División B side La Roda for one season.

Career statistics
.

References

External links
 

1993 births
Living people
People from Huangshi
Chinese footballers
Footballers from Hubei
Shanghai Shenhua F.C. players
Xinjiang Tianshan Leopard F.C. players
China League Two players
China League One players
Chinese Super League players
Chinese expatriate footballers
Expatriate footballers in Spain
Chinese expatriate sportspeople in Spain
Association football midfielders
La Roda CF players